Nicolas Puydebois (born February 28, 1981 in Bron, Rhône) is a former French goalkeeper.

Honours
 Trophée des Champions: 2002, 2004
Ligue 1: 2004–05

References

External links
RC Strasbourg's official site profile

1981 births
Living people
People from Bron
French footballers
France youth international footballers
Association football goalkeepers
Olympique Lyonnais players
RC Strasbourg Alsace players
Nîmes Olympique players
Ligue 1 players
Ligue 2 players
Sportspeople from Lyon Metropolis
Footballers from Auvergne-Rhône-Alpes